Discovery Networks Northern Europe was a branch of Discovery, Inc.

It was responsible for overseeing Discovery International channels in Belgium, Denmark, Finland, Iceland, Ireland, Luxembourg, the Netherlands, Norway, Sweden and the United Kingdom.

History
It started out with the launch of the Discovery Channel in Europe in 1989 and was for a long time a part of Discovery Networks Europe (DNE). In mid-2007, DNE was split into two separate branches, Discovery Networks UK and Discovery Network EMEA, both headquartered in London. Again in 2011, Discovery Networks Europe was split into two key branches Discovery Networks Western Europe (DNWE) and Discovery Networks CEEMEA (Central & Eastern Europe, Middle East and Africa). DNEW is located in London and DNCEMEA in Warsaw.

In November 2014, Discovery Networks Western Europe was split into Discovery Networks Northern Europe and Discovery Networks Southern Europe. Its previous Discovery Networks Western Europe served 30 different countries including the United Kingdom, Ireland, Iceland, Denmark, Sweden, Norway, France, the Netherlands and other territories, comprising 18 brands.

It was previously called Discovery Networks Western Europe.

Regional
This network operated in six European languages: a pan-European English speaking channel and channels in Danish, Dutch, English for UK, Ireland and Iceland, Finnish, Norwegian, and Swedish.

Regional Branches:
 Discovery Networks Benelux
 Discovery Networks UK & Ireland
 SBS Discovery Media (Nordic)

References

External links
 Discovery Networks Businesses & Brands at Discovery Communications

Entertainment companies established in 1989
Television channels and stations established in 1989